Rogiet Primary School is located in the village of Rogiet, Monmouthshire, Wales.  It caters for pupils aged 4 to 11 years of age. The current catchment area is Rogiet, Highmoor Hill, Five Lanes and Caerwent.

Owing to the unusual demographics of Rogiet, with an unusually elderly population in the 1970s and 1980s, and thus a low number of children, school provision in the area was lagging behind other similar villages. The old school building was small, worn and lacking in modern facilities. A large expansion of housing in the village from the 1990s onwards made better school provision a pressing need.

In November 2009, the school moved into a new building with many state of the art features. In 2010, it was awarded the BREEAM Excellence Awards for the UK and Wales, scoring a rating of 78.18%. This award acknowledges the school building as having the highest rating for sustainability of any school or educational building in the country. The building was designed by White Design Ltd. and constructed by Willmott Dixon. Both of these companies worked closely with the pupils, staff and local community to ensure that all opinions and ideas for the new school were addressed. The pupils, through the school council and older pupils, requested the inclusion of many eco-friendly features including solar panels, energy efficient lighting and a wind turbine. Children and staff watched the complete process of the school build and were regularly invited onto site by Willmott Dixon’s team. The building has since been seen by architects as an exemplar of current best practice in the building of sustainable schools.

References

External links

Primary schools in Monmouthshire